This is a list of former railway operating companies operating in Australia. For former Government authorities, see List of former government railway authorities of Australia.

National
Australian Railroad Group
Freight Australia
QR National

New South Wales
Brown's Richmond Vale Railway
Sydney Railway Company
Rosehill Railway Company
Silverton Tramway Company
South Maitland Railway
National Rail Corporation

Queensland
Aramac Tramway – 1913–1975, run by shire council

South Australia
South Australian Railway's

Tasmania
Emu Bay Railway
Launceston and Western Railway
Mount Lyell Mining and Railway Company
North Mount Lyell Railway
Tasmanian Main Line Company

Victoria
Connex Melbourne
Freight Victoria
Geelong and Melbourne Railway Company
Great Northern Rail Services
Kerang-Koondrook Tramway
M>Train
Melbourne and Hobson's Bay Railway Company
Melbourne and Suburban Railway Company
Melbourne, Mount Alexander and Murray River Railway Company
Powelltown Tramway
St Kilda and Brighton Railway Company
V/Line Freight
West Coast Railway

Western Australia
Great Southern Railway
Midland Railway of Western Australia

See also
History of rail transport in Australia
Rail transport in Australia

Railway, Australia
Australia, Defunct
Companies, Defunct
Railway, Defunct